Touqiao is a town in Guangling District, Yangzhou, Jiangsu, China. , it administers Touqiao Residential Neighborhood, Hongqiao Community, as well as the following 15 villages:
Touqiao Village
Jiusheng Village
Xinqiao Village
Xicheng Village
Antie Village
Datong Village
Nanhua Village
Erqiao Village
Anfu Village
Hongping Village
Yingxin Village
Qingfeng Village
Guoyu Village
Fucheng Village
Xinhua Village

References

Township-level divisions of Jiangsu
Yangzhou